Roland Chassain (5 February 1947 – 9 February 2021) was a French politician.

Biography
As a member of the National Assembly, he fought for the reestablishment of the death penalty for acts of terrorism. However, the Constitution of France was rewritten in 2007 to eliminate the death penalty. That year, he was defeated by Michel Vauzelle of the Socialist Party.

Chassain ran again in 2012, but withdrew in favor of the National Front candidate and rallying voters against Michel Vauzelle, though Vauzelle retained the seat.

During the 2012 Union for a Popular Movement leadership election, Chassain supported Jean-François Copé to be leader of the party. Following a contested election, he called for Nicolas Sarkozy to be President of the UMP, and for Copé and François Fillon to be co-presidents. In a December 2012 interview with Minute, Chassain called for more unity between the UMP and the National Front.

Roland Chassain died on 9 February 2021 at the age of 74, four days after his birthday.

Distinctions
Knight of the Legion of Honour (2009)

References

1947 births
2021 deaths
People from Aurillac
Mayors of places in Provence-Alpes-Côte d'Azur
Rally for the Republic politicians
Union for a Popular Movement politicians
The Republicans (France) politicians
Chevaliers of the Légion d'honneur